John Syme RSA (1795 – 3 August 1861) was a Scottish portrait painter.

Life

A nephew of Patrick Syme, he was born in Edinburgh and studied in the Trustees' Academy on Picardy Place. He became a pupil and assistant of Sir Henry Raeburn, whose unfinished works he completed, and subsequently practised with success as a portrait-painter in Edinburgh.

In the 1830s he is listed as living at 32 Abercromby Place in Edinburgh's Second New Town.

Syme was an original member of the Royal Scottish Academy, founded in 1826, and took an active part in its management. He died in Edinburgh on 3 August 1861.

Works

He painted many portraits. That of John Barclay M.D. was exhibited at the London Royal Academy in 1819, and went to the Scottish National Gallery; it was engraved in mezzotint by Thomas Hodgetts, as were also those of John Broster and Andrew McKean. Syme's self-portrait went to the Royal Scottish Academy. His portrait of the Solicitor General, Lord Cockburn, was deposited with the Academy as his diploma work. A portrait of Alexander Henderson, Lord Provost of Edinburgh 1823-1825 hangs in the Merchant Hall in Edinburgh.

References

Attribution

1795 births
1861 deaths
Scottish portrait painters
19th-century Scottish painters
Scottish male painters
Alumni of the Edinburgh College of Art
19th-century Scottish male artists